Pettenasco is a comune (municipality) in the Province of Novara in the Italian region of Piedmont, located about  northeast of Turin and about  northwest of Novara. It lies on the eastern shore of Lake Orta.

The municipality of Pettenasco contains the frazioni (subdivisions, mainly villages and hamlets) Pratolungo, Crabbia, and Poggio Luneglio.  A daily ferry service connects Pettenasco with Omegna and towns and villages around the lake.

Pettenasco borders the following municipalities: Armeno, Miasino, Omegna and Orta San Giulio.

Demographic evolution

References

External links
 - Pettenasco Village
 -The Wood Turning Art Museum

Cities and towns in Piedmont